Cerney is a placename and a surname. It may refer to:

 Places
 Cerney, a former village or hamlet near the Welsh town of Wrexham
 Cerney Wick, a village near Cirencester, Gloucestershire. England
 North Cerney, a village and civil parish in the English county of Gloucestershire
 South Cerney, a village and civil parish in the English county of Gloucestershire
 RAF South Cerney, a former Royal Air Force station located in South Cerney
 South Cerney Castle, an adulterine castle of motte and bailey construction in South Cerney
 South Cerney railway station, a former railway station at South Cerney
 People
 David Cerney, Member of Parliament for Malmesbury, England
 Mark Cerney (born 1967), American founder of the Next of Kin Registry
 Todd Cerney (1953-2011), American songwriter and musician

See also 
 Cerne (disambiguation)
 Churney (disambiguation)
 Czerny (disambiguation)